Isooncodine is an anticholinergic alkaloid.  It was first synthesized in 1989 because it is an isomer of oncodine, an azafluorenone alkaloid derived from Meiogyne monosperma. It was first derived from the leaves of Polyalthia longifolia.

External links

Anticholinergic alkaloids